Vít Hlaváč (born 26 February 1997) is a Czech racewalker.

He won the National title 3 times:

 50 km race walk on track: 3:56:29 (NR) at	Mestský atletický štadión, Trnava (SVK)	5 December 2020
 50 km Race Walk: 3:52:54 in Dudince (SVK)	20 March 2021
 20 km Race Walk: 1:29:12 in Olomouc (CZE)	10 April 2021

National record:
 35 km Race Walk: 2:32:50 (NR) in Eugene, Oregon (USA) 24 July 2022

References

External links
 
 Czech language: Athlete profile

1997 births
Living people
Place of birth missing (living people)
Czech male racewalkers
Czech Athletics Championships winners
Athletes (track and field) at the 2020 Summer Olympics
Olympic athletes of the Czech Republic